Ursula Herking (28 January 1912 – 17 November 1974) was a German film actress. She appeared in more than 130 films between 1933 and 1972. She was born in Dessau, Germany and died in Munich, West Germany.

Selected filmography

 Susanne in the Bath (1936)
 Stronger Than Regulations (1936)
 Uncle Bräsig (1936)
The Chief Witness (1937)
 Togger (1937)
 The Grey Lady (1937)
 The Four Companions (1938)
 Red Orchids (1938)
  Twelve Minutes After Midnight (1939)
 Goodbye, Franziska (1941)
 A Gust of Wind (1942)
 Love Me (1942)
 Bravo Acrobat! (1943)
 Beloved Darling (1943)
 A Man With Principles? (1943)
 Nora (1944)
 The Roedern Affair (1944)
 A Wife for Three Days (1944)
 Thank You, I'm Fine (1948)
 Trouble Backstairs (1949)
 Shadows in the Night (1950)
 Who Drove the Grey Ford? (1950)
 Furioso (1950)
 Unknown Sender (1950)
 When a Woman Loves (1950)
 You Have to be Beautiful (1951)
 Shadows Over Naples (1951)
 Love and Blood (1951)
 The Chaste Libertine (1952)
 The Day Before the Wedding (1952)
 Dutch Girl (1953)
 I and You (1953)
 Not Afraid of Big Animals (1953)
 Columbus Discovers Kraehwinkel (1954)
 Ball of Nations (1954)
 Children, Mother, and the General (1955)
 Operation Sleeping Bag (1955)
 The Spanish Fly (1955)
 Special Delivery (1955)
 The Old Forester House (1956)
 A Heart Returns Home (1956)
 Fruit in the Neighbour's Garden (1956)
 Munchhausen in Africa (1958)
 The Blue Sea and You (1959)
 Pension Schöller (1960)
 I Will Always Be Yours (1960)
 Bankraub in der Rue Latour (1961)
  (1963, TV miniseries)

References

External links

1912 births
1974 deaths
German film actresses
People from Dessau-Roßlau
20th-century German actresses
Burials at the Westfriedhof (Munich)